Hoplit may refer to:

 Hoplite was a citizen and soldier in Ancient Greece
 Mil Mi-2 was codenamed Hoplit by NATO